Johanna Hedva (born 1984) is a Korean American contemporary artist, writer, and musician. They are the author of the 2018 novel On Hell, and Minerva the Miscarriage of the Brain, a collection of poetry, plays, and essays published in 2020. Their work deals with death and grieving, illness and disability, as well as mysticism, ritual, and Ancient Greek myth. They describe their music as "hag blues, mystical doom, and intimate metal," and have cited the influence of Korean Pansori singing and Korean shamanism, as well as Diamanda Galás, Keiji Haino, and Sainkho Namtchylak.

Early life and education
Born in 1984 in Santa Barbara, California,. At age 22, Hedva began studying astrophysics at a city college before transferring two years later to UCLA to study design. After graduating with a Bachelor of Arts degree in Design from UCLA in 2010, Hedva earned a Master of Fine Arts at the California Institute of the Arts in 2013, and a Master of Arts in Aesthetics and Politics at the California Institute of the Arts in 2014.

Writing

Essays

In October 2015, Hedva delivered a lecture at the Women’s Center for Creative Work titled, "My Body Is a Prison of Pain so I Want to Leave It Like a Mystic But I Also Love It & Want it to Matter Politically". The LA Weekly described it as a "smart, compelling talk... which became the essay 'Sick Woman Theory' ". 

Their influential essay Sick Woman Theory "describes [their] own chronic, confounding illness and the impersonality of the Western medical industry, and suggests that the greatest enemy to capitalism is taking care of yourself and of others". Sick Woman Theory posed the question, "How do you throw a brick through the window of a bank if you can't get out of bed?" Influenced by Ann Cvetkovich's scholarship on depression, Sick Woman Theory takes illness as not a solely biological phenomenon, but a social and cultural one, claiming that "the body and mind are sensitive and reactive to regimes of oppression," and affirming the role of collective historical trauma in producing illness. Lauren Fournier wrote, "Johanna Hedva articulates an ethos of agency for those living with chronic illness".

Artslant Magazine reported:

Following the release of Sick Woman Theory, Hedva published In Defense of De-Persons. Of the essay, Dundee Contemporary Arts said:

In February 2018, Hedva published "Letter to A Young Doctor," in Triple Canopy's Risk Pool issue. "A document of emergency," an epistolary essay on the terms of engagement between patient and doctor.

In 2019, Hedva started publishing essays on music, mysticism, and gender, which will eventually be a book on what they say are "the two hardest things in the world to write about: music and mysticism." The essays discuss the bands Lightning Bolt, Sunn O))), and Nine Inch Nails, and their guitarist Robin Finck.

Books

On 14 February 2018, Sator Press published Hedva's novel On Hell. The book was selected by Dennis Cooper as one of his favorite books of fiction for 2018. Janice Lee wrote, "Brilliant. Fervent. Unafraid and unapologetic. This text will consume you." According to Hedva, "On Hell is my attempt at a 21st-century version of Icarus, from a crip perspective."

Minerva the Miscarriage of the Brain was published in September 2020 by Sming Sming and Wolfman Books.  Olivia Fletcher for Burlington Contemporary describes the book: "Told in ten discrete parts, the book covers the last decade of Hedva’s life and work, weaving together essays, poems and photographic documentation of their performance art."
"The Times Literary Supplement writes "this Berlin-based artist regularly returns to the idea of sleep – as trauma and death, as labour and therapy, as communion and embodiment – and as an aesthetic practice."

Hedva's next novel Your Love is Not Good will be published by And Other Stories.

Performances

From 2012 to 2015, Hedva wrote and directed a series of plays and performances titled The Greek Cycle. These plays are adaptations of ancient Greek texts which have been rewritten to include feminist and queer concerns in contemporary discourses, like Hedva's adaptation of Medea, with the role of Medea rewritten to be performed by and as a genderfluid, queer person of color in exile. Most take place in unusual locations; for instance, Odyssey Odyssey, an adaptation of Homer's Odyssey, was performed in a Honda Odyssey minivan being driven by a performer.

In October 2018, Hedva began performing Black Moon Lilith in Pisces in the 4th House, a solo of guitar and voice, that became the album of the same name, released in 2021. They performed as part of the disability festival I Wanna Be With You Everywhere at Performance Space New York. They continued touring the piece in the USA and Europe including No End and No Beginning in January 2020 at Wellcome Collection, London, and Creepy Teepee Festival in December, 2020. 

Hyperallergic noted: "Johanna Hedva also ghosted after building a droning crescendo in the finale of “Black Moon Lilith in Pisces in the 4th House,” leaving the audience in the collective discomfort of loud sound and powerful vibration. Their music was an alchemical transmutation of chronic pain, trauma, and death.

Personal Life 
Hedva is genderqueer, and uses they/them pronouns.

Music

In 2019, Hedva released their album, The Sun and the Moon. ArtReview called The Sun and the Moon “a black slurry of rich, harsh noise, industrial beats, and grainy samples. Like much of Hedva’s work, the album is a celebration of darkness, an evocation of the swampy zone where the sacred and profane meet.”

On January 1, 2021, Hedva released the album, Black Moon Lilith in Pisces in the 4th House. Live performances of the work were described in Artforum as "crooning, mournful solo guitar and vocals". In Bandcamp Daily, Philip Freeman writes, "Their voice is part Diamanda Galás, part Korean pansori singing, part widow wailing at graveside, rising to a gigantic operatic swoop like a vulture arcing slowly in the sky."  In The Wire magazine, reviewer Claire Biddles points out Jeff Buckley influences and says that "Hedva moves at their own pace throughout the recording, but the songs aren't gentle for this—the analogy with grief, and the discomfort of those who witness it, is clear."

Art

Hedva's recent exhibitions cross disciplines. In 2019, "Reading Is Yielding"  was part of Parrhesiades multi platform project by curator Lynton Talbot.  This work related to another exhibition, "The Season of Cartesian Weeping", where Hedva contributed video and works on paper including posters of the birth charts of Simone Weil and Robin Finck.

God Is An Asphyxiating Black Sauce was a 2020 solo exhibition at Klosterruine Berlin. Available at Klosterruine, Franziskaner-Klosterkirche, online, and as posters throughout the city, the exhibition invested care in accessibility.  The central work of the exhibition was a 38 track playlist titled "Playlist to a Void", composed of the artist's own poems and essays read aloud with compositions of their own and of collaborators. The nature of the work attended "to issues of absence and somatic accessibility on a structural level", while "Hedva’s essays, poems, and songs lead us towards an inner sanctum in which they ask, is absence ever really empty, and does absence ever truly exist?"

Selected works
 "Everything Is Erotic Therefore Everything Is Exhausting", Two Serious Ladies, 2015.
 "Euripides Is Not a Genius. I Am.", Eleven Eleven, 2016.
 "Sick Woman Theory", Mask Magazine, 2016.
 "In Defence of De-Persons", GUTS, 2016.
 "Letter To A Young Doctor", Triple Canopy, 2018.
 "A Vacuum Is Also a Plenum and Both Make Music Make Life", Art Practical, 2019. 
 "The Mysticism of Mosh Pits, Or, The Mess of Sociality, Or, Have You Ever Seen Lightning Bolt Live?", Third Rail Quarterly, 2020. 
 "She, Etcetera", The White Review, 2019. 
 "Get Well Soon", Get Well Soon, 2020.
 "What Can Be Seen Farther than Any Color On Earth", LUX, 2020. 
 "‘They're Really Close To My Body’: A Hagiography Of Nine Inch Nails And Their Resident Mystic Robin Finck", The White Review, 2020.

See also

Disability studies
Processing (programming language)

References

External links
 

1984 births
Living people
American contemporary artists
UCLA School of the Arts and Architecture alumni
California Institute of the Arts alumni
People with non-binary gender identities
Non-binary writers
People from Santa Barbara, California
Writers from Santa Barbara, California
Artists from Santa Barbara, California
Non-binary artists
Non-binary musicians
Genderfluid people